Growing Pains is the eighth studio album by American singer-songwriter Mary J. Blige. An R&B album that was released on December 18, 2007, by Geffen Records, it debuted at number 2 on the Billboard 200, selling 629,000 copies in its first week, and reached number one in January 2008. Growing Pains was ranked number 29 on Rolling Stones list of the Top 50 Albums of 2007 and was eventually certified Platinum by RIAA.

"Work That"  was released as the second single on December 18, 2007, and managed to peak inside the top 20 of the Billboard Hot R&B/Hip-Hop Songs and number 65 in the Billboard Hot 100. The third official single, "Stay Down" reached the top 40 R&B charts, and was chosen in favor of "Hurt Again", which was originally the third single, but eventually was only a radio single by receiving airplay in Spring 2008. Growing Pains was awarded the Best Contemporary R&B Album at the 51st Grammy Awards in February 2009.

Background
In an interview for Blues & Soul, Blige explained the significance of the album's title, stating:

Singles
"Just Fine" was released as the album's lead single on October 2, 2007. It was the only single from the album which was released in multiple formats. The song peaked at number 22 on the Billboard Hot 100 and number 3 on the U.S. Hot R&B/Hip-Hop Songs chart. In the UK, the song performed well, peaking at number 16 on the official chart. "Work That" was released as the album's second single on December 18, 2007. The single charted from digital downloads when the album was released, and eventually peaked at number 65 on the Billboard Hot 100, but did become a top 20 hit on the Hot R&B/Hip-Hop Songs. The song "Hurt Again" was intended to be released as the official third single from Growing Pains, but at the last minute was changed in the favor of "Stay Down". Between the loss of momentum from the album's first and second single and lack of promotion for the single, "Stay Down" did not chart on the Billboard Hot 100 chart; it peaked at number 14 on the Billboard Hot R&B/Hip-Hop Singles chart.

Critical reception

Growing Pains received positive reviews from most music critics. At Metacritic, which assigns a normalized rating out of 100 to reviews from mainstream critics, the album received an average score of 77, based on 17 reviews, which indicates "generally favorable reviews". Allmusic editor Marisa Brown gave it four out of five stars and called it "a mature, polished, and utterly professional set of well-crafted songs", noting that "the album takes an even greater step toward pop". Alex Macpherson of The Guardian complimented its themes of Blige's "past and present", while citing the track "Roses" as "one of the best songs of her career". NME commented that it "finds Blige on chirpier form". Michael Arceneaux of PopMatters complimented Blige's "cheerful demeanor" on the album and called it "a good addition to the Mary J. Blige catalogue". USA Todays Edna Gundersen wrote that "Her vulnerability and vocal prowess are undeniable, and resistance melts away as her voice [...] commands and communicates with startling clarity". Steven Hyden of The A.V. Club commended Blige for "reaching beyond the relative stability of her personal life and playing up the vulnerable everywoman persona that's long resonated with her female fanbase". BBC Online's Talia Kraines commended Blige for "keeping it real" and complimented her "empowering emotion".

However, Andy Gill of The Independent commented that "it's hard to tell whether the whiplash snares and crisp handclap grooves [...] are suited to [Blige's] needs here" and criticized "Blige's capitulation to R&B cliché, with all women downtrodden and all men culpable, and a corrosively bling-driven worldview". Slant Magazines Eric Henderson called the album an "overstuffed collection of affirmations, self-definitions, and keepin'-it-real-isms" and wrote that "what's both most compelling and most limiting about Blige's Growing Pains: She keeps her most salable characteristic, her emotiveness, under duress, which provides tension but no release". Alfred Soto of The Village Voice noted "no more drama, but plenty of (occasionally excellent) melodrama", adding that "as her acting chops diminish, her command over plush, slightly jagged Contempo r&b improves". Writing for Rolling Stone, critic Robert Christgau commented that "the tone of her confessions has changed with her music", stating " Growing Pains is an edgier record than The Breakthrough, but Blige has definitely lost or just outgrown the brassy urgency of her twenties". In his consumer guide for MSN Music, Christgau described the album as "an expensive, honorable, credible sampler of the hottest current R&B brands", and gave it an A− rating.

Accolades
In 2008, at the 50th Grammy Awards, "Just Fine" was nominated in the 'Best Female R&B Vocal Performance' category, losing the award to Alicia Keys' "No One".

At the 2009 51st Grammy Awards it was nominated for Best Contemporary R&B Album and  Just Fine was nominated for Best Remixed Recording, Non-Classical.  The album won Best Contemporary R&B Album.

Commercial performance
Growing Pains sold 629,000 copies in its first week and debuted at number two on the U.S. Billboard 200 chart, and number one on the R&B chart. In its second week the album climbed to number one on the Billboard 200 with 204,000 copies sold. In the UK, the album entered the charts at number 6, making it her highest-charting album there since No More Drama in 2001 with first week sales of 21,755. In Germany, the album was her worst one charting, peaking number 48 and staying on the German Albums Chart for only 3 weeks.
As of March 27, 2010, the album had sold over 81,681 copies in the UK.

Track listing

Notes and sample credits
  denotes co-producer
  denotes vocal producer
"Talk to Me" contains a sample from "Key to My Heart", written by Robert Wright and Verdine White, and performed by The Emotions.

Personnel 
Credits for Growing Pains adapted from Allmusic.

 Judi Acosta-Stewart – production coordination
 Nick Banns – assistant
 Lee Blaske – strings
 Mary J. Blige – executive producer
 Jesse Bond – guitar
 Andre Bowman – bass
 Dru Castro – engineer
 Danny Cheung "Stems" – vocal engineer
 Andrew Coleman – engineer
 Bryan-Michael Cox – musician, producer
 Vidal Davis – producer
 Patrick Dillett – vocal engineer
 The-Dream – vocals
 Duane Dugger – horn
 Mikkel Storleer Eriksen – engineer
 Ron Fair – string arrangements, string conductor
 Theron "Neff U" Feemster – musician, producer
 Drew FitzGerald – creative director
 Brian "Big Bass" Gardener – mastering
 Sean Garrett – producer, vocals
 Chuck Harmony – engineer, musician, producer
 Kuk Harrell – vocal engineer, vocal producer
 Andre Harris – producer
 Mike Hogue – assistant
 Curtis Hudson – engineer

 Eric Hudson – engineer, musician, producer
 Kendu Isaacs – management, vocal engineer
 Jaycen Joshua – mixing
 Jazze Pha – drum programming, keyboards, producer
 Kim Kimble – hair stylist
 James King – horn
 Markus Klinko – photography
 Andrea Liberman – stylist
 DeJion Madison – producer
 Ne-Yo – producer
 The Neptunes – producer
 Alec Newell – engineer
 Chris "TEK" O'Ryan – engineer
 Dave Pensado – mixing
 Omar Phillips – percussion
 Justin Pintar – assistant
 Haye Price – horn
 Omar Reyna – assistant
 Christopher "Tricky" Stewart – drum Programming, keyboards, mixing supervision, producer
 Supa Engineer "Duro" – mixing
 Sam Thomas – engineer
 Pat Thrall – overdub engineer, post production engineer
 Corey Williams – engineer
 Andrew Wuepper – assistant

Charts

Weekly charts

Year-end charts

Certifications

Release history

References

External links 
 
 Growing Pains at Discogs
 Growing Pains at Metacritic

2007 albums
Mary J. Blige albums
Albums produced by Bryan-Michael Cox
Albums produced by Chuck Harmony
Albums produced by Dre & Vidal
Albums produced by Eric Hudson
Albums produced by Jazze Pha
Albums produced by Kuk Harrell
Albums produced by the Neptunes
Albums produced by Ne-Yo
Albums produced by Sean Garrett
Albums produced by Stargate
Albums produced by Theron Feemster
Albums produced by Tricky Stewart
Geffen Records albums
Grammy Award for Best Contemporary R&B Album